Eino August Räsänen (15 November 1921, Kuopion maalaiskunta – 8 September 1997) was a Finnish politician. He was a Member of the Parliament of Finland from 1962 to 1970, representing the Agrarian League, which renamed itself the Centre Party in 1965.

References

1921 births
1997 deaths
People from Kuopio
Centre Party (Finland) politicians
Members of the Parliament of Finland (1962–66)
Members of the Parliament of Finland (1966–70)